Birgir Borgþórsson (born 2 November 1958) is an Icelandic weightlifter. He competed in the men's heavyweight I event at the 1980 Summer Olympics.

References

1958 births
Living people
Icelandic male weightlifters
Olympic weightlifters of Iceland
Weightlifters at the 1980 Summer Olympics
Place of birth missing (living people)